Brian Gabriel Puntano (born 11 May 1996) is an Argentine professional footballer who plays as a forward.

Career
Puntano had youth stints with Newell's Old Boys, Independiente and, from August 2017 on loan, Talleres before joining Temperley in 2018; his senior career began in Primera B Nacional with the latter. He appeared for his professional debut on 20 April 2019, featuring for seventy minutes of a draw at home to Platense under manager Cristian Aldirico; he was replaced on the field by Federico Mazur.

Career statistics
.

References

External links

1996 births
Living people
Footballers from Rosario, Santa Fe
Argentine footballers
Association football forwards
Primera Nacional players
Torneo Federal A players
Club Atlético Temperley footballers
Sportivo Las Parejas footballers
Deportivo Maipú players